The Belgian national men's field hockey team represents Belgium in international men's field hockey and is controlled by the Royal Belgian Hockey Association, the governing body for field hockey in Belgium.

Belgium won the Men's Hockey World Cup in 2018, the European Championship in 2019, the 2020-21 FIH Pro League and the gold medal at 2020 Tokyo Olympics. They also won a silver medal at the 2023 Bhubaneswar & Rourkela and 2016 Rio de Janeiro and a bronze medal at the 1920 Antwerp Summer Olympics, . They reached eight semi-finals at the European Championship since 1995, including a third place in 2007 and runners-up in 2013 and 2017.

History
Hockey was introduced in Belgium in 1902. The country's first club was founded in 1904. In 1907, several clubs established the Belgian Hockey Association. Belgium played its first international match against Germany, and was one of the founding members of the International Hockey Federation (FIH).

Between 1920 and 1978, Belgium appeared in two of the first three World Cups and in eleven out of thirteen Summer Olympics. After the successful early years (before the 1950s) with three times being among the best five at the Summer Olympics, it would last six decades before Belgium reached the international field hockey top again from the 1990s on.

By the early 2000s, the Royal Belgian Hockey Association started to invest heavily in the youth and modernized its structures. In 2007, Belgium won the bronze medal at the European Championship, a first in the country's history. Belgium also qualified for the 2008 Summer Olympics, for the first time in 32 years.

Belgium won a silver medal at the 2016 Summer Olympics, a second medal after Belgium ended third at the 1920 Summer Olympics in Antwerp. Two years later Belgium won the 2018 Hockey World Cup. It was the first major international title in the country's history. A year later Belgium won the gold medal at the European Championship which was held in Antwerp. They secured their second consecutive olympic medal through reaching the gold medal match at the 2020 Summer Olympics.

Honours
Summer Olympics
 First place: 2020
 Second place: 2016
 Third place: 1920

World Cup
 First place: 2018
 Second place: 2023
European Championship
 First place: 2019
 Second place: 2013, 2017
 Third place: 2007, 2021

FIH Pro League
 First place: 2020–21
 Second place: 2019, 2021–22

Hockey World League
 Second place: 2014-15

Champions Challenge
 First place: 2011
 Third place: 2005

Belgian National Sports Merit Award
Winners: 1959, 2019

Belgian Sportsteam of the Year
Winners: 2012, 2016, 2018, 2019

Tournament history
A red box around the year indicates a tournament played within Belgium.

Summer Olympics
 Gold   Silver   Bronze   Fourth place

World Cup

 Champions   Runners-up   Third place   Fourth place

European Championship
 Champions   Runners-up   Third place   Fourth place

FIH Pro League
 Champions   Runners-up   Third place   Fourth place

Hockey World League (defunct)
 Winners   Runners-up   Third place   Fourth place

Champions Trophy (defunct)
 Winners   Runners-up   Third place   Fourth place

Champions Challenge (defunct)
 Winners   Runners-up   Third place   Fourth place

*Draws include matches decided on a penalty shoot-out.

Team

Current squad
The following 18 players were named on 5 December 2022 for the 2023 World Cup from 13 to 29 January 2023 in Bhubaneswar and Rourkela, India.

Head coach: Michel van den Heuvel

Recent call-ups
The following players have been called up for the national team in the last 12 months.

See also
 Belgium men's national under-21 field hockey team
 Belgium women's national field hockey team

References

External links

FIH profile

 
European men's national field hockey teams
Field hockey in Belgium
Men's sport in Belgium